Sir Philip James Vandeleur Kelly  (1878–1948) was a cavalry officer and a brigadier-general of the British Army.

Biography
Kelly of Castle Connell, County Limerick, Ireland graduated from the Royal Military College, Sandhurst, on 3 May 1898 and joined the 3rd (The King's Own) Hussars as a second lieutenant the following day. He was promoted to lieutenant on 17 January 1900, and was stationed with his regiment at Lucknow and Bengal in India. Ten years later, he was seconded to the Egyptian Army and as a captain was awarded the Imperial Ottoman Order of the Medjidieh, Fourth Class. This was followed by a second foreign award the Order of the Nile, Third Class on 20 June 1916. As a lieutenant-colonel he was given command of the Anglo Egyptian Darfur Expedition and following its successful conclusion was awarded a British Distinguished Service Order, and made a Knight Commander of the Order of Saint Michael and Saint George both in 1917.

He next served as the brigade commander of both the 5th Mounted and the 13th Cavalry Brigades, during the Sinai and Palestine campaign. His last military post was as commanding officer of the 14th West Riding Battalion, Home Guard during the Second World War. Philip James Vadeleur Kelly died in 1948.

References

1878 births
1948 deaths
British Army cavalry generals of World War I
Graduates of the Royal Military College, Sandhurst
Knights Commander of the Order of St Michael and St George
3rd The King's Own Hussars officers
Companions of the Distinguished Service Order
British people in colonial India